Johann Helton (born 1953) is a guitarist, bassist, teacher and sound engineer currently residing in Boise, Idaho.  For 20 years he was a member of the folk group The Highwaymen.  He has recorded five CDs of original material and appears on five Highwaymen albums.  He is  an adjunct professor of guitar at Boise State University. Idaho Statesman Entertainment Editor Michael Deeds has referred to Helton as one of "Idaho's long-loved guitarists".

References 

Living people
The Highwaymen (country supergroup) members
Boise State University faculty
1953 births